Terry Sanchez Wallace Jr. (born March 23, 1994), known professionally as Tee Grizzley, is an American rapper best known for his singles "First Day Out", "No Effort", "Colors", and "From the D to the A" (featuring Lil Yachty).

After being released from prison in October 2016, Grizzley released his debut single "First Day Out" through YouTube. The song gained over two million views in less than three weeks, and led to Grizzley signing a record deal with 300 Entertainment and Atlantic Records in 2017. After releasing numerous mixtapes and singles throughout 2017, Grizzley released his debut studio album, Activated in 2018, which peaked at number 10 on the Billboard 200.

Early life
Wallace was born on March 23, 1994, in Detroit, Michigan, and was raised by his grandmother near the intersection of Joy Rd. & Southfield Freeway in the Warrendale neighborhood due to his mother and father constantly being in and out of prison. In middle school he began developing an interest in rap music and eventually formed the musical group All Stars Ball Hard along with three of his friends, JR, Po, and Lee. Wallace took the moniker of ASBH Tee, and they began uploading their songs to YouTube. In 2011, his mother was sentenced to 20 years in prison for drug trafficking and released in late 2020. His father was murdered in 2012.

Wallace was the first member of his family to attend college in generations. He attended Michigan State University to study finance and accounting. After undergoing financial difficulties, he and a friend of his began to burglarize other students' dormitories. They stole $20,000 worth of electronics and money from other students in February 2014. On February 27, Wallace and Jeremy Ford were caught but released pending investigation.

Wallace went on the run, and fled to Kentucky. On July 1, 2014, Wallace was one of three people arrested following an attempted robbery at a jewelry store in Lexington, Kentucky. Wallace was sentenced to nine months for the robbery, and, while already serving that sentence, he was sentenced to 18 months to 15 years for the Michigan State robberies in September 2015. On October 16, 2016, he was released from prison in Michigan.

Career

2016–2019: Debut singles, My Moment, Activated, and collaborations
While in prison, Wallace began to take rapping more seriously and wrote the entirety of his debut mixtape while incarcerated. After being released from prison, where he took the name Tee Grizzley, he released his debut single "First Day Out" in November 2016. The music video, posted to YouTube, gained over 2 million views in less than three weeks. He later signed to  300 Entertainment & Atlantic Records in 2017. He released his second single, "Second Day Out", in February 2017. His third single "From the D to the A" featuring Lil Yachty was released in March 2017.

He released "No Effort" and its accompanying music video on March 31, 2017. His debut mixtape My Moment was released on April 7, 2017. Grizzley said that his record sales tripled after his song was featured in a LeBron James Instagram post. Grizzley's song "Teetroit" was released on July 28, 2017. The single "Beef", featuring Meek Mill, was released on September 1, 2017. He received two 2017 BET Hip Hop Award nominations for Best New Hip-Hop Artist and Best Mixtape for My Moment.

He released the song "Win" on October 6, 2017. He released the song "What Yo City Like" with rapper Lil Durk on November 30, 2017, as the lead single for Bloodas. The two then released the joint mixtape Bloodas on December 8, 2017. He released the single "Colors" on February 2, 2018. The single "Don't Even Trip" featuring Moneybagg Yo was released on March 14, 2018.

On March 9, 2018, Grizzley had a feature in Lil Yachty's new album Lil Boat 2 in the song "Get Money Bros.". His debut studio album, Activated, was released on May 11, 2018. In August, he received a 2018 MTV Video Music Award nomination for Push Artist of the Year. He released the mixtape Still My Moment on November 9, 2018. In May 2019, he released the single "Locked Up".

On August 20, 2019, his vehicle was shot at in Detroit, Michigan. His aunt/manager Jobina Brown was killed in the shooting, she was 41. He and the driver survived the incident unharmed. On September 20, 2019, Grizzley released his single "Satish" accompanied with a music video to commemorate Brown's death.

2020–present: The Smartest, Built for Whatever and Half Tee Half Beast
In January 2020, Tee Grizzley released the single "Red Light". In March, he released the single "Payroll" featuring Payroll Giovanni. His song "No Talkin" was featured in the Netflix film Coffee & Kareem. He released the song "I Spy" on May 1, and "Mr. Officer" on June 5 in response to the murder of George Floyd and police brutality. The song features Queen Naija and members of the Detroit Youth Choir. He released the mixtape The Smartest on June 19.

On May 7, 2021, Tee Grizzley released his third studio album, Built for Whatever, a 19-track record that includes guest appearances from artists such as the late King Von and Young Dolph, as well as Lil Durk, YNW Melly, Quavo, G Herbo, and Big Sean.

On April 15, 2022, Tee Grizzley released the mixtape Half Tee Half Beast, along with a video for the track "Robbery Part 3". He explained the mixtape's title: "Yeah, I"m human like everyone else, but also the things I've been through and had to survive made me a beast".

Personal life
In February 2021, My'Eisha Agnew gave birth to Wallace's first child, a son named Terry Wallace III.

Grizzley is an avid gamer and began streaming in 2020 to fans on the video streaming platform Twitch. The vast majority of his streams are centered around Grand Theft Auto V.

Discography

Studio albums

Mixtapes

Collaborative mixtapes

Singles

As lead artist

As featured artist

Other charted songs

Awards and nominations

Notes

References

1994 births
Living people
African-American male rappers
Rappers from Detroit
Midwest hip hop musicians
Songwriters from Michigan
American people convicted of robbery
21st-century American rappers
21st-century American male musicians
Twitch (service) streamers
African-American songwriters
21st-century African-American musicians
American male songwriters